The Harvard Crimson men's ice hockey team is a National Collegiate Athletic Association (NCAA) Division I college ice hockey program that represents Harvard University. The Crimson are a member of ECAC Hockey. They play at the Bright Hockey Center in Boston, Massachusetts. The Crimson hockey team is one of the oldest college ice hockey teams in the United States, having played their first game on January 19, 1898, in a 0–6 loss to Brown.

The Crimson's archrival is the Cornell Big Red. The teams meet at least twice each season for installments of the historic Cornell-Harvard hockey rivalry.

History

Early history
 The Crimson hockey team was founded in 1898 making the team one of the oldest college ice hockey teams in the United States. The team played on a local pond and played their first recorded intercollegiate game against Brown on January 19, 1898, at Franklin Field in Boston. The rivalry is the oldest continuing college hockey series in the country. The Crimson lost that game 0–6 but the Brown-Harvard rivalry continued and later become US college hockey's oldest rivalry.
The two teams played again the following winter; Brown won that game by a score of 2–1. The Crimson would get their first recorded win in program history in 1900 with a 10–1 win over MIT. That same season Harvard beat Brown in back to back games. On February 26, 1900, Harvard played Yale for the first time. The game was held at the St. Nicholas Rink in New York and the 4–5 loss was the Crimson's only loss of the 1899–1900 season.

In 1903 Alfred Winsor became the team's first official head coach. The team previously used captains in a player-coach role, including Winsor who served as the Crimson's captain from 1901 to 1902. Under Winsor the team recorded a 22-game winning streak that spanned five and a half seasons and lasted from January 10, 1903, to Jan 19, 1907.

After beginning the program on a pond and playing on various outdoor rinks constructed on campus over the seasons, the university constructed two ice rinks inside Harvard Stadium for the 1904 season and move some old bleachers to the side of the rink. The university also began charging admission for select important games for the first time. The Crimson later moved home games to the Boston Arena, the first indoor ice rink in Boston and one of the oldest in the United States. A few years after moving into the Boston Arena, on March 14, 1913, the Harvard University Athletic Committee voted to make ice hockey a major sport in the university's athletic department. Following the 1917 season Alfred Winsor stepped down as the head coach after compiling a 124–29 record in 15 seasons as Crimson head coach. The following season was suspended because of World War I with the team resuming play in 1919.

1919–1944
From 1919 to 1921 the team went back to playing at outdoor rinks after the Boston Arena caught fire in the fall of 1918. The Crimson returned to the arena after it was rebuilt in the fall of 1921. Following three seasons again with no official coach, William H. Claflin became the second coach in program history in 1921 On March 7, 1923, William H. Claflin and captain George Owen '23 substituted entire forward lines instead of individuals, in the first recorded use of a line change. The idea proved successful as Harvard defeated Yale 2–1 in overtime.

On March 12, 1930, Harvard and Yale played the final game of a three-game series to end the 1930 season. The two teams split the first two games of the series. The game was called off at midnight due to blue laws despite the teams being tied in the third overtime and a record crowd in excess of 14,000. The resulting tie caused the two rivals to share the 1929–30 intercollegiate title.

Joseph Stubbs became the fourth head coach in program history starting with the 1927–28 season.  He stepped down after the 1937–38 season with a record of 95–43–6 record in 11 seasons. Stubbs led the team to four seasons of double-digit wins, including two back-to-back 11-win seasons in 1930–31 and 1931–32, as well as a 12-win season in 1935–36, and leading the Crimson to a 15–1 record in 1936–37.

The Quadrangular League was created for the 1933–34  with Harvard, Yale, Princeton and Dartmouth, the league is considered the predecessor to the Ivy League. In 1936, the Council of Ivy Group Presidents agreed on the formal formation of the League, however the agreement did not go into effect until the 1955–56 season.

1945–1960
The program was suspended for two years during World War II but then returned to the ice for an abbreviated 1945–46 season. In 1950 Ralph "Cooney" Weiland became head coach, Weiland was a former NHL scoring champion who won Stanley Cups as both a player and a coach with the Boston Bruins. With the hire, Weiland became the first non-alumnus to become head coach of the program.

Weiland guided Harvard to win the inaugural Beanpot hockey tournament on December 27, 1952, when the team defeated Boston University 7–4. A few seasons later Weiland's Crimson team competed in the 1955 NCAA Ice Hockey Tournament. It was the first Frozen Four appearance by the university. The 1954–55 season was highlighted by William J. "Billy" Cleary leading the nation in scoring with 89 points in 21 games, his point total still stands as the Harvard single-season record. Cleary and classmate Chuck Flynn become Harvard's first All-Americans. The team returned to the tournament in 1957 and 1958. All three tournament appearances under Weiland saw the Crimson exit in the semi-final round.

In 1956 Harvard moved into the 2,000-seat Donald C. Watson Rink bringing hockey back on campus from the Boston Arena. The rink was located north of Harvard Stadium.

Harvard became a founding member of the ECAC Hockey League in 1961. That same season, on January 4, 1962, Harvard defeated Northeastern 6–1 for the program's 500th win. In its second season in the ECAC, Harvard won both the league regular season championship and, with a 4–3 overtime win over Boston University, won the league championship.

At the conclusion of the 1970–71 season Weiland left the program after 21 years. He compiled a record of 316–172–17, six Ivy League championships, two ECAC championships, and five NCAA appearances. Weiland was named coach of the year by the American Hockey Coaches Association in 1955 and 1971. In 1971 he was inducted into the Hockey Hall of Fame and received the Lester Patrick Award for contribution to hockey in the United States in 1972.

1971–1990
Bill Cleary, former Crimson All-American, took over coaching duties for the 1971–72 season after serving as an assistant coach under Weiland. On March 7, 1975 – Harvard defeated Cornell 6–4 to win the 23rd game of the season, the first 20-win season in program history. Unfortunately, the Crimson would lose in the finals the next day to Boston University and finish fourth in the NCAA Tournament with defeats to Minnesota and the same BU squad. The team was captained by All-American Randy Roth '75, who the previous year was named the Crimson's first ever ECAC Player of the Year.

By the mid-1970s the Donald C. Watson Rink was becoming outdated and the university made plans to construct a new hockey facility. A decision was eventually made to extensively upgrade the facility and in 1978 the walls were removed and the roof was extended before the new arena was installed at a cost exceeding $5-million. During the renovation the Harvard's men's and new women's teams played out of various local rinks in 1978–79. Following the renovation the facility was named after former Harvard hockey player Alec Bright '19. The Bright Hockey Center increased seating by more than 800 people The ice surface was extended by five feet to 204 feet by 87 feet under the direction of coach Cleary.

Cleary lead the Crimson to their third conference tournament championship by beating Providence 4–1 in the ECAC Championship, sending the Crimson to the 1983 NCAA Tournament. Harvard first defeated Michigan State in the two-game quarter-final series by a combined score 9–8. The Crimson advanced to the Frozen Four in Grand Forks, North Dakota and defeated Minnesota 5–3 to send Harvard to the program's first NCAA Championship appearance. The Crimson was defeated in the NCAA final 2–6 by Wisconsin. Despite the loss in the final, Mark Fusco became the school's first Hobey Baker Award winner. Three seasons later, his brother, Scott Fusco became the second player and first ever pair of brothers to win the Award.

Despite a 2–3 overtime loss to Vermont in the ECAC semifinals, the 1988–89 team received an at-large bid to the 1989 NCAA Tournament, the team's fifth straight NCAA Tournament appearance. Harvard swept Lake Superior State in the two game quarter-final round by a combined score of 9–4. The team advanced to the Frozen Four in St. Paul, Minnesota and defeated Michigan State 6–3 before facing the hometown Minnesota Golden Gophers in the championship. Harvard won their first NCAA Championship on April 1, 1989 when senior forward Ed Krayer score in overtime to give the Crimson a 4–3 overtime victory. Following the game, Lane MacDonald became the third player in program history to earn the Hobey Baker Award.

Recent history

Bill Cleary ended his tenure as head coach at the conclusion of the 1989–90 season to become the director of athletics. In his 19 seasons as head coach for the program he won 324 games and took the Crimson to the NCAA Tournament nine times, the Frozen Four on seven occasions, and the first National Championship for Harvard. The ECAC regular season championship, the Cleary Cup, is named in honor of the former Harvard player, coach, and Olympian for his efforts to form the conference. Longtime assistant Ronn Tomassoni was named head coach for the following season. In his first season as head coach on February 1, 1992, Tomassoni guided Harvard to the program's 1,000 win when it defeats Union, 7–3.

In 1993 the team returned to the NCAA Tournament for the first time since their championship in 1989. The Crimson lost in double overtime to Northern Michigan 2–3. Harvard returned to the NCAA the following season in 1994 and advanced to the Frozen Four with a 7–1 win over New Hampshire. In the NCAA semifinal the Crimson fell to Lake Superior State 3–2 in overtime. finishing the year a record of 24–5–4. The appearance in the 1994 Frozen Four was the last of the program to date.

Mark Mazzoleni became the tenth coach in program history on July 16, 1999. Under Mazzoleni the Crimson reached the NCAA Tournament three straight seasons in 2001–02, 2002–03, and 2003–04. The streak was extended to five straight seasons, tying a program high, by Ted Donato in 2004–05 and 2005–06.

Adam Fox played for the team as a freshman for the 2016–17 season, led all NCAA defensemen in the nation with 40 points, and led all NCAA defensemen and all NCAA freshmen skaters in assists with 34, as he played 35 games.  He was named 2017 ECAC Rookie of the Year and Ivy League Rookie of the Year. In his junior 2018–19 season, he was the top scoring player and defenseman in the country with 1.45 points per game.  He led the NCAA in assists, while also setting school single-season records for assists by a defenseman.  Fox also broke the school record for points by a Harvard defenseman in one season, set by Mark Fusco in 1983.

Season-by-season results

Source:

Championships

NCAA
1-time NCAA men's champions: 1989

Ivy League champions
24-time Ivy League men's champions: 1956, 1957, 1958, 1961, 1962, 1963, 1974, 1975, 1982, 1983*, 1984*, 1985*, 1986, 1987, 1988, 1989, 1990, 1993, 1994, 2000, 2006, 2016*, 2017, 2022
(*denotes tie)

ECAC Hockey
11-time ECAC men's champions: 1963, 1971, 1983, 1987, 1994, 2002, 2004, 2006, 2015, 2017, 2022
11-time ECAC men's regular-season champions: 1963, 1973*, 1975, 1986, 1987, 1988*, 1989, 1992, 1993, 1994, 2017*

(*denotes tie)

Beanpot championships

Championships: 1953, 1955, 1960, 1962, 1969, 1974, 1977, 1981, 1989, 1993, 2017

Mariucci Classic
1-time Mariucci Classic champion: 2016(Jan)

Coaches

Harvard's men's team has been in continual operation since 1897 with two notable exceptions. The university did not field a team for the 1917–18 season nor was there a team from 1943 through the spring of 1945. These three seasons were lost as a result of the two world wars that occurred during the first half of the 20th century. For two periods early in the team's history the team was coached by their captains; those years have been included here for continuity.

As of completion of 2019–20 season

Awards and honors

Hockey Hall of Fame
Source:

Cooney Weiland (1971)

United States Hockey Hall of Fame
Source:

Joe Cavanagh (1994)
John Chase (1973)
Bill Cleary (1976)
Bob Cleary (1981)
Mark Fusco (2002)
Scott Fusco (2002)
John Garrison (1973)
Austie Harding (1974)
Lane MacDonald (2005)
Fred Moseley (1975)
George Owen (1973)
Robert Ridder (1976)
Ben Smith (2017)
Alfred Winsor (1973)

NCAA

Individual awards

Hobey Baker Award
Mark Fusco: 1983
Scott Fusco: 1986
Lane MacDonald: 1989
Jimmy Vesey: 2016

Spencer Penrose Award
Cooney Weiland: 1955, 1971
Bill Cleary: 1983

NCAA Division I Ice Hockey Scoring Champion
Bill Cleary, F: 1955
Bob Cleary, C: 1957

Tournament Most Outstanding Player
 Ted Donato, LW; 1989

All-Americans
AHCA First Team All-Americans

1954-55: Bill Cleary, F
1957-58: Bob Cleary, F
1961-62: David Johnston, D
1962-63: David Johnston, D
1968-69: Joe Cavanagh, F
1969-70: Joe Cavanagh, F
1970-71: Joe Cavanagh, F
1971-72: Dave Hynes, F
1972-73: Bob McManama, F
1973-74: Randy Roth, F
1974-75: Brian Petrovek, G; Randy Roth, F
1980-81: Mark Fusco, D
1981-82: Mark Fusco, D
1982-83: Mark Fusco, D
1984-85: Scott Fusco, F
1985-86: Scott Fusco, F
1986-87: Mark Benning, D; Lane MacDonald, F
1988-89: Lane MacDonald, F
1992-93: Ted Drury, F
1993-94: Sean McCann, D; Steve Martins, F
2002-03: Dominic Moore, F
2004-05: Noah Welch, F
2011-12: Danny Biega, D; Alex Killorn, F
2014-15: Jimmy Vesey, F
2015-16: Jimmy Vesey, F
2016-17: Adam Fox, D
2017-18: Adam Fox, D; Ryan Donato, F
2018-19: Adam Fox, D
2019-20: Jack Rathbone, D
2021-22: Nick Abruzzese, F

AHCA Second Team All-Americans

1956-57: Bob Cleary, F
1985-86: Grant Blair, G; Mark Benning, D
1986-87: Hank Lammens, D
1987-88: Don Sweeney, D
1988-89: C. J. Young, F
1989-90: Chris Harvey, G; C. J. Young, F
1990-91: Peter Ciavaglia, F
1993-94: Derek Maguire, D
2002-03: Noah Welch, D
2004-05: Dov Grumet-Morris, G
2016-17: Alexander Kerfoot, F
2019-20: Nick Abruzzese, F
2021-22: Henry Thrun, D

ECAC Hockey

Individual awards

ECAC Hockey Player of the Year
 Randy Roth; 1974
 Scott Fusco; 1985, 1986
 Lane MacDonald; 1989
 Peter Ciavaglia; 1991
 Ted Drury; 1993
 Steve Martins; 1994
 Jimmy Vesey; 2015, 2016
 Ryan Donato; 2018
 Sean Farrell; 2023

ECAC Hockey Rookie of the Year
 Kent Parrot; 1966
 Joe Cavanagh; 1969
 Jack Hughes; 1977
 Mark Fusco; 1980
 J. R. Prestifilippo; 1997
 Adam Fox; 2017

ECAC Hockey Best Defensive Defenseman
 Dave Johnston: 1963
 Danny Biega: 2012
 Henry Thrun: 2023

ECAC Hockey Best Defensive Forward
 Tom Cavanagh; 2005

Ken Dryden Award
 Oliver Jonas: 2001
 Kyle Richter: 2008

ECAC Hockey Student-Athlete of the Year
 Kyle Criscuolo; 2015, 2016

Tim Taylor Award
 Bill Cleary: 1988

ECAC Hockey Most Outstanding Player in Tournament

 Gene Kinasewich; 1963
 Dave Hynes; 1971
 Mitch Olson; 1983
 Lane MacDonald; 1987
 Sean McCann; 1994
 Tyler Kolarik; 2002
 Brendan Bernakevitch; 2004
 John Dagineau; 2006
 Jimmy Vesey; 2015
 Merrick Madsen; 2017
 Matthew Coronato; 2022

All-Conference
First Team All-ECAC Hockey

 1961–62: David Johnston, D; Gene Kinasewich, F; Tim Taylor, F; Dave Grannis, F
 1962–63: David Johnston, D; Gene Kinasewich, F; Tim Taylor, F
 1963–64: Gene Kinasewich, F; Ike Ikauniks, F
 1968–69: Joe Cavanagh, F
 1970–71: Joe Cavanagh, F
 1972–73: Bob McManama, F
 1973–74: Randy Roth, F
 1974–75: Brian Petrovek, G
 1976–77: Jack Hughes, D
 1980–81: Mark Fusco, D
 1982–83: Mark Fusco, D; Scott Fusco, F
 1984–85: Scott Fusco, F
 1985–86: Scott Fusco, F
 1986–87: Randy Taylor, D; Mark Benning, D; Lane MacDonald, F
 1987–88: Don Sweeney, D
 1988–89: Lane MacDonald, F
 1989–90: C. J. Young, F; Mike Vukonich, F
 1990–91: Peter Ciavaglia, F; Ted Donato, F
 1992–93: Ted Drury, F
 1993–94: Sean McCann, D; Brian Farrell, F; Steve Martins, F
 2000–01: Oliver Jonas, G
 2002–03: Dominic Moore, F; Tim Pettit, F
 2004–05: Noah Welch, D
 2007–08: Kyle Richter, G
 2011–12: Danny Biega, D; Alex Killorn, F
 2014–15: Jimmy Vesey, F
 2015–16: Jimmy Vesey, F
 2016–17: Adam Fox, D; Alexander Kerfoot, F
 2017–18: Adam Fox, D; Ryan Donato, F
 2018–19: Adam Fox, D
 2021–22: Nick Abruzzese, F
 2022–23: Sean Farrell, F; Henry Thrun, D

Second Team All-ECAC Hockey

 1961–62: Harry Howell, D
 1962–63: Godfrey Wood, G; Harry Howell, D; Ike Ikauniks, F; Bill Lamarche, F
 1963–64: Mike Petterson, D
 1967–68: Bob Carr, D
 1968–69: Chris Gurry, D
 1969–70: Joe Cavanagh, F
 1971–72: Dave Hynes, F; Bob McManama, F
 1972–73: Bill Corkery, F
 1973–74: Levy Byrd, D; Bob Goodenow, F
 1974–75: Jim Thomas, F; Randy Roth, F
 1977–78: Jack Hughes, D
 1981–82: Mark Fusco, D
 1984–85: Grant Blair, G
 1985–86: Randy Taylor, D; Mark Benning, F; Tim Smith, F
 1986–87: Tim Barakett, F
 1988–89: C. J. Young, F; Allen Bourbeau, F; Peter Ciavaglia, F
 1989–90: Chris Harvey, G
 1990–91: Mike Vukonich, F
 1993–94: Derek Maguire, F
 2000–01: Dominic Moore, F
 2001–02: Brett Nowak, F
 2002–03: Noah Welch, D
 2004–05: Dov Grumet-Morris, G; Tom Cavanagh, F
 2005–06: Dylan Reese, D
 2006–07: Dylan Reese, D
 2010–11: Danny Biega, D
 2014–15: Patrick McNally, D; Kyle Criscuolo, F
 2015–16: Kyle Criscuolo, F
 2016–17: Ryan Donato, F
 2021–22: Mitchell Gibson, G; Henry Thrun, D
 2022–23: Mitchell Gibson, G; Alex Laferriere, F

Third Team All-ECAC Hockey

 2005–06: Kevin Du, F
 2007–08: Alex Biega, F
 2008–09: Alex Biega, F
 2010–11: Patrick McNally, F
 2015–16: Alexander Kerfoot, F
 2016–17: Mike Madsen, G
 2017–18: Reilly Walsh, D
 2021–22: Alex Laferriere, F

ECAC Hockey All-Rookie Team

 1987–88: Peter Ciavaglia, F
 1988–89: Chuckie Hughes, G; Allain Roy, G; Kevin Sneddon, D
 1989–90: Ted Drury, F
 1990–91: Derek Maguire, D; Sean McCann, D
 1991–92: Ben Coughlin, D; Brad Konik, F; Steve Martins, F
 1992–93: Aaron Israel, G; Tripp Tracy, G
 1993–94: Ashlin Halfnight, D
 1995–96: Ben Storey, D; Craig Adams, F; Craig MacDonald, F
 1996–97: J. R. Prestifilippo, G
 1997–98: Steve Moore, D; Chris Bala, F
 1999–00: Dominic Moore, F
 2000–01: Tim Pettit, F
 2001–02: Noah Welch, D
 2006–07: Alex Biega, D
 2009–10: Louis Leblanc, F
 2011–12: Steve Michalek, G; Patrick McNally, D
 2012–13: Jimmy Vesey, F
 2016–17: Adam Fox, D
 2017–18: Reilly Walsh, D; Jack Baldini, F
 2018–19: Jack Rathbone, D; Casey Dornbach, F; Jack Drury, F
 2021–22: Ian Moore, D; Alex Laferriere, F; Matthew Coronato, F
 2022–23: Ryan Healey, D; Joe Miller, F

Olympians
This is a list of Harvard alumni were a part of an Olympic team.

† Were members of the AHA team that was allowed to play in the Olympics but disqualified from medal contention.

Statistical leaders
Source:

Career points leaders

Career goaltending leaders

GP = Games played; Min = Minutes played; W = Wins; L = Losses; T = Ties; GA = Goals against; SO = Shutouts; SV% = Save percentage; GAA = Goals against average

Minimum 40 games

Statistics current through the start of the 2022–23 season.

Harvard Athletic Hall of Fame
The following is a list of people associated with the Harvard men's ice hockey program who were elected into the Harvard Athletic Hall of Fame (induction date in parenthesis).

Alfred Winsor (1967)
Daniel Newhall (1967)
Trafford Hicks (1967)
Fred Huntington (1967)
William Clafin (1967)
Edward Bigelow (1968)
Jabish Holmes (1968)
Clark Hodder (1997)
John Chase (1969)
Joseph Morrill (1969)
Rene Giddens (1969)
John Garrison (1969)
Paulde Give (1970)
Fred Mosely (1970)
George Ford (1971)
George Roberts (1971)
Austie Harding (1971)
Goodwin Harding (1972)
Richard Mechem (1973)
Bill Cleary (1980)
Charles Flynn (1980)
Bob Cleary (1982)
Edwyn Owen (1982)
John Wylde (1983)
Albert Everts (1988)
David Johnston (1988)
Gene Kinasewich (1991)
Joe Cavanagh (1993)
Robert McVey (1995)
Bruce Durno (1995)
Dave Hynes (1996)
Bob McManama (1996)
Walter Greeley (1997)
Amory Hubbard (1997)
Randy Roth (1997)
John Paine (1998)
Brian Petrovek (1998)
Mark Fusco (2002)
Scott Fusco (2002)
Mark Benning (2004)
Lane MacDonald (2004)
C. J. Young (2005)
Peter Ciavaglia (2006)
Ted Donato (2006)
Sean McCann (2006)
Allen Bourbeau (2007)
Ted Drury (2008)
Jerry Pawloski (2010)
Don Sweeney (2010)
Steve Martins (2010)
Dominic Moore (2018)

Current roster
As of August 6, 2022.

|}

Crimson in the NHL
As of July 1, 2022.

Source:

See also
Cornell–Harvard hockey rivalry
Harvard Crimson women's ice hockey

References

External links

 

 
Ice hockey teams in Massachusetts